The second season of the American television drama series Sons of Anarchy premiered on September 8, 2009, and concluded on December 1, 2009, after 13 episodes aired on cable network FX. Created by Kurt Sutter, it is about the lives of a close-knit outlaw motorcycle club operating in Charming, a fictional town in California's Central Valley. The show centers on protagonist Jackson "Jax" Teller (Charlie Hunnam), the vice president of the club, who begins questioning himself. 

Sons of Anarchy is the story of the Teller-Morrow family of Charming, California, as well as other members of the Sons of Anarchy Motorcycle Club, Redwood Original (SAMCRO), their families, various Charming townspeople, allied and rival gangs, associates, and law agencies that undermine or support SAMCRO's legal and illegal enterprises. 

Introduced in this season are white separatists called the League of American Nationalists (LOAN). LOAN arrives in Charming with leader Ethan Zobelle and Zobelle's enforcer, A.J. Weston, seeking to drive SAMCRO out of Charming.

Plot
White separatists called the League of American Nationalists (LOAN) arrive in Charming. LOAN's leader Ethan Zobelle and Zobelle's enforcer, A.J. Weston, seek to drive the Sons of Anarchy from Charming. To send a message to SAMCRO, Zobelle orchestrates to have Gemma kidnapped and gang raped by Weston and two others. Due to the improper handling of an internal problem, the rift between Clay and Jax continues to widen as Jax challenges most of Clay's decisions and comes to a head when a lone car bomb nearly kills another member of SAMCRO. The second season sees SAMCRO battling LOAN for control of Charming, Jax and Clay veering further apart in their individual visions for the club, and evading the ever-present threat of the ATF.

Cast and characters

Main cast
 Charlie Hunnam as Jackson "Jax" Teller, a disillusioned club member who is the Vice President of the Sons of Anarchy Motorcycle Club Redwood Original in Charming. He discovers a written diary by his late father John that makes him question his life and the club. He is at odds with club President and stepfather Clay Morrow.
 Katey Sagal as Gemma Teller Morrow, Jax's mother and the queen of Charming. She is the matriarch of the club. She is married to Clay
 Mark Boone Junior as Robert "Bobby Elvis" Munson 
 Kim Coates as Alex "Tig" Trager 
 Tommy Flanagan as Filip "Chibs" Telford 
 Ryan Hurst as Harry "Opie" Winston 
 Johnny Lewis as Kip "Half Sack" Epps 
 William Lucking as Piermont "Piney" Winston 
 Theo Rossi as Juan-Carlos "Juice" Ortiz 
 Maggie Siff as Tara Knowles 
 Ron Perlman as Clarence "Clay" Morrow

Special guest cast
 Adam Arkin as Ethan Zobelle 
 Ally Walker as Agent June Stahl
 Tom Everett Scott as Rosen

Recurring cast 
 Dayton Callie as Wayne Unser 
 Henry Rollins as A.J. Weston 
 Taylor Sheridan as Deputy Chief David Hale 
 Winter Ave Zoli as Lyla Dvorak 
 Callard Harris as Edmond Hayes 
 Jamie McShane as Cameron Hayes
 Sarah Jones as Polly Zobelle
 Julie Ariola as Mary Winston
 Mitch Pileggi as Ernest Darby 
 McNally Sagal as Margaret Murphy 
 Marcos de la Cruz as Estevez 
 Kristen Renton as Ima Tite 
 Kurt Sutter as "Big" Otto Delaney 
 Emilio Rivera as Marcus Álvarez 
 Tory Kittles as Laroy Wayne 
 Bellina Logan as Fiona Larkin 
 Michael Marisi Ornstein as Chuck Marstein 
 Patrick St. Esprit as Elliott Oswald
 Dendrie Taylor as Luann Delaney 
 Titus Welliver as Jimmy O'Phelan
 Kenneth Choi as Henry Lin
 Jeff Kober as Jacob Hale, Jr. 
 Glenn Plummer as Sheriff Vic Trammel

Guest stars
 Tom Arnold as Georgie Caruso
 Cleo King as Neeta 
 Olivia Burnette as Homeless Woman 
 Kenny Johnson as Herman Kozik

Production
Although Sons of Anarchy is set in Northern California's Central Valley, it is filmed primarily at Occidental Studios Stage 5A in North Hollywood. Main sets located there include the clubhouse, St. Thomas Hospital and Jax's house. The production rooms at the studio used by the writing staff also double as the Charming police station. 

External scenes were often filmed nearby in Sun Valley and Tujunga.

Kurt Sutter, series writer and creator, said that Half-Sack was killed off in "Na Trioblóidí" because Johnny Lewis wanted to leave the show due to creative differences; He said: "We decided we'd find some noble way for him to go. It wasn't my intent to try to be sensational and kill off a main character."

Reception
The second season received critical acclaim. This season also saw a substantial increase in positive reviews in comparison with the first season. On Rotten Tomatoes, the second season has a rating of 93%, based on 15 reviews, with an average rating of 8.7/10. The site's critical consensus reads: "Sons of Anarchy continues to intensify the drama with riveting storytelling brought to life by a talented ensemble." On Metacritic the second season has a score of 86 out of 100, based on reviews 6 critics, indicating "universal acclaim".

IGN gave the second season an 8.4/10.0 rating, giving praise to Henry Rollins' character, AJ Weston, saying, "A decidedly stronger second season sees the gang unravel and knit back together."

Writing for Chicago Tribune, Maureen Ryan called the second season "engrossing". She elaborated that "the pacing is better [and] the plotting is tighter" and commended Sagal and Perlman for their performances. Variety’s Stuart Levine called the new season "compelling" and complimented the acting skill of Perlman, Sagal, Hunnam, and Siff. James Poniewozik of TIME called Sagal's performance "devastatingly powerful" and named the series on his list of Top 10 Shows of 2009.

Episodes

Home media release
The second season was released in the United States on DVD and Blu-ray on August 31, 2010.

References

External links
 Sons of Anarchy at FXNetworks.com
 

 
2009 American television seasons